Tim Cooney may refer to:

 Tim Cooney (sound engineer) (born 1951), American production sound mixer
 Tim Cooney (baseball) (born 1990), American baseball player